Mordellistena nigrobrunnen is a species of beetle in the genus Mordellistena of the family Mordellidae.

References

nigrobrunnen